Locker 13 (originally released as Locker 13: Down and Out) is a 2009 anthology thriller film directed by Bruce Dellis, Jason Marsden, Matthew Mebane, Adam Montierth, and Donovan Montierth. The story was written by John Waldron; the screenplay by Bruce Dellis, Jason Marsden, Donovan Montierth, Jose Rosete, Jason Walters, and Cameron Young. The film was produced by Danny Del Toro, Shawn Haught, Jason Marsden, Neil Mather, Maria White Mebane, Matthew Mebane, Jose Rosete, Rick Schroder, and Nick Stahr.

Plot
Skip (Jason Spisak) works at an Old West theme park and is told several stories by his supervisor Archie (Jon Gries). Each story contains not only a strange locker with the number 13 on it, but also involves themes about making the right choices and the consequences of not doing so. The stories range from an aging boxer faced with a big choice to a young man desperate to take his own life.

Cast
 Krista Allen as Patricia
 Tatyana Ali as Lucy
 Jason Marsden as Suicide Jack
 Jon Gries as Archie
 Rick Schroder as Tommy Novak
 Curtis Armstrong as Clifford
 Bart Johnson as Eugene MacClemore
 Jon Polito as Don Dillon
 Rick Hoffman as Armando
 Thomas Calabro as Harvey
 Carmen Perez as Marcia
 David Huddleston as Floyd
 Jesse Garcia as Ray
 Vanessa White as TV Personality #1 (voice)
 Steve Eastin as Doc Herman
 Jimmy Gambina as Jesse
 Jose Rosete as Jake
 Elizabeth Bond as TV Personality #2 (voice)
 Cathy Rankin as Lola
 Jason Spisak as Skip
 Victor Campos as Nate
 Amanda Melby as Erica 
 Marina Benedict as Rachel
 Deonte Gordon as Boxer
 Bob Rue as Linus
 Steve Briscoe as Manfred
 John Schile as B.B.O.N.E.O. Member
 Maria White Mebane as News Anchor (voice)
 Ed Gary as Supporting
 Montgomery Maguire as Ring Announcer
 Herb Dean as Trainer
 Steven Motta as Billy 'Thunderheart' Marco
 Michael Anthony Rosas as Cut Man / Corner Man
 Lamar Newmeyer as Grover
 Rory Pierce as Supporting
 Klor Rowland as Gavin

Production
Plans to create Locker 13 began in 2007 after Waldron met Adam and Donovan Montierth of Brothers' Ink Productions at a film festival, where they started planning an anthology feature film. The trio sought other filmmakers to join the film by utilizing social media and writing websites, and raised funding via a successful Kickstarter campaign.

Reception
Critical reception for Locker 13 has been predominantly negative. The film holds a rating of 13% on Rotten Tomatoes based on 8 reviews. On Metacritic it has a score of 22% based on 6 reviews.

Variety and The Hollywood Reporter both panned the film, and The Hollywood Reporter commented that "Despite a couple of mildly arresting vignettes, this philosophy-minded effort doesn’t offer enough genuine thrills to compensate for its pretensions." RogerEbert.com gave the movie 1 star and criticized it as being "amateurishly acted, illogically plotted, cruelly violent and needlessly sexist". In contrast, Fangoria gave the movie 2 1/2 out of 4 stars and stated that "Occasionally problematic, LOCKER 13 makes up for its weaknesses with good performances, intriguing stories and an unconventional approach to its segments." Twitch Film called the film "fine, light entertainment" but noted that it may not "stand out or linger long after viewing".

Awards
Jury Award at the Atlanta Film Festival (2009, won)

References

External links
 
 

2009 films
2000s thriller films
American thriller films
American anthology films
Kickstarter-funded films
2000s English-language films
2000s American films